is a train station in Akiha-ku, Niigata, Niigata Prefecture, Japan.

Lines

Layout
The station consists of two ground-level opposed side platforms serving two tracks, connected by a footbridge.  The station is unattended.

Platforms

History
The station opened on 28 May 1949. With the privatization of Japanese National Railways (JNR) on 1 April 1987, the station came under the control of JR East.

Surrounding area
Niigata University of Pharmacy and Applied Life Sciences
Kanetsu Middle School
Kanetsu Elementary School

See also
 List of railway stations in Japan

External links
 JR East station information 

Railway stations in Niigata (city)
Shin'etsu Main Line
Railway stations in Japan opened in 1949